Saudi Canadians ( lit. So’odioon Canadioon) are Canadians of Saudi descent or Saudis who have Canadian citizenship. According to the 2011 Census there were 7,955  Canadians who claimed Saudi ancestry.

Demography 
Most Saudi Canadians speak Arabic, English or French. According to the 2011 Census there were 7,955  Canadians who claimed Saudi ancestry.

Until August 2018, there were over 16,000 Saudi students on government scholarships in Canada. There were more than 15,000 Saudi students in Canada in 2007, including 800 resident physicians and specialists who provided care to the Canadian population. In 2015, Saudi Arabian students represented 3% of total foreign students in Canada. Official figures provided by the Saudi Arabian Cultural Bureau in Canada (SACB) indicated that in 2014 there were 16,000 Saudi scholarship students in Canada and 1,000 medical trainees.

Notable people
Ensaf Haidar, Raif Badawi's wife and children were granted political asylum by the Government of Canada in 2013 and currently reside in Sherbrooke, Quebec. Haidar and her three children with Badawi became Canadian citizens on Canada Day, 2018. On the same day Haidar called for the niqab to be banned.

See also

 Canada–Saudi Arabia relations
 Embassy of Saudi Arabia, Ottawa
 Arab Canadians
 Saudi Americans
 Saudi Australians

References

External links 

Arab Canadian
Canada